John Cadeliña is a Filipino Pop Christian singer and also an arranger of gospel songs. He had formed the band called Skeights, when he became a finalist in the talent show Pilipinas Got Talent Season 2.

In 2015, he had also collaborated with Fr. Raul G. Caga SVD and Laarni Lozada for the album Gracious Mercy and on the same year he also been released his Album called Follow The Light.

In 2016, he also competed for Vispop Music Festival with Irving Guazon.

References

Living people
1989 births
People from Agusan del Sur
Filipino male pop singers
Filipino gospel singers
Star Music artists
21st-century Filipino male actors